The Vice State President of South Africa was a position established between 1981 and 1984. Alwyn Schlebusch was the only holder of the position.

The position was created under constitutional reforms in 1981, which abolished the Senate, and created a President's Council, chaired by the Vice State President, to advise on the drafting of a new constitution. The post was abolished when the 1983 Constitution came into effect, combining the ceremonial post of State President with that of Prime Minister, to create an executive post, with only provision for an Acting State President.

The executive position of Deputy President of South Africa was established in 1994.

Vice State President of South Africa
Party

See also
State President of South Africa

References

Apartheid government
South Africa
Titles held only by one person